Calvin Byron Stadium  (formerly known as El Empalme) is a 2,500–3,000 seat baseball field in El Empalme, Changuinola.  It is the home of the Tortugueros (Turtle Men) of Bocas del Toro.

History
The original stadium name was "El Empalme." In 1998, the name was changed to honor local baseball player and trainer Calvin Byron.

Also, former Anaprof soccer founder team Chirilanco FC played games in this stadium in the '80s.

There is a small movement to restore stadium's name to original name El Empalme, since Calvin Byron as person did not express affection for Bocas del Toro Province, and showed interest returning to Nicaragua.

Features
The stadium was completely remodeled in 2009, and has light towers for night playing. The government donated a new electronic scoreboard in 2012.

References

Baseball venues in Panama
Buildings and structures in Bocas del Toro Province